The heats for the women's 100 m freestyle race at the 2009 World Championships took place on the morning of 30 July, with the final in the evening session of 31 July at the Foro Italico in Rome, Italy.

Records
Prior to this competition, the existing world and competition records were as follows:

The following records were established during the competition:

* World and Championships record split from the 4 × 100 m freestyle relay

Results

Heats

Semifinals

Final

External links 
Heats Results
Semifinals Results
Final Results

Freestyle Women's 100 m
2009 in women's swimming